Harry Hall was an English footballer who played as an inside-forward for Southampton in the Southern League in 1915.

Football career
Hall was born in Fleckney in Leicestershire and played his early football with Market Harborough Town in the Leicestershire Senior League.

Hall originally played in the reserves before making his solitary first-team appearance as a replacement for Arthur Dominy at inside-right for the Southern League match at Bristol Rovers on 17 March 1915, with his former Market Harborough colleague George Crick at centre-half.

Hall remained with Southampton through the First World War, making two appearances in the wartime leagues, but was released before the resumption of league football in 1919.

References

External links
 Football career details

1889 births
Footballers from Leicestershire
Year of death missing
English footballers
Association football inside forwards
Southampton F.C. players
Southern Football League players
People from Harborough District